Devin Sibley (born February 6, 1996) is an American basketball player for Island Storm in the National Basketball League of Canada, the highest tier of basketball in Canada. He played college basketball for Furman.

College career
In his freshman season in college, Sibley was named Southern Conference Freshman of the Year after averaging 10.1 points per game. On February 1, 2017, Sibley earned Lou Henson Award National Player of the Week honors after averaging 24.5 points in two games. As a junior he was named Southern conference player of the year.  He averaged 17.3 points and 4.1 rebounds per game to lead Furman to a 21-10 regular season record and a share of the school's first regular season league title since 1991. As a senior, he was named first team all-SoCon. He averaged 14.2 points and 4.9 rebounds per game.

Professional career
Sibley signed with the Swedish team Köping Stars in 2018. However, he left the team in December 2018. He joined the Georgian team BC Titebi in August 2019. Sibley signed with the Halifax Hurricanes of NBL Canada in December 2019. In February 2020, he joined the Island Storm.

References

External links
Furman Paladins bio

1996 births
Living people
American men's basketball players
Basketball players from Knoxville, Tennessee
Furman Paladins men's basketball players
Point guards
Halifax Hurricanes players
Island Storm players
American expatriate basketball people in Sweden
American expatriate basketball people in Georgia (country)
American expatriate basketball people in Canada